Seyed Shamseddin Seyed-Abbasi (February 5, 1943, Tehran – March 16, 2004, Tehran) was an Iranian wrestler who won a bronze medal in freestyle at the 1968 Summer Olympics.

Seyed-Abbasi died at 3 o'clock on the afternoon of 16 March 2004 (26 Esfand 1382 AH) in Iranmehr Hospital in Gholhak, Tehran from cancer.

References

 Biography
 www.sports-reference.com

1943 births
2004 deaths
Wrestlers at the 1968 Summer Olympics
Wrestlers at the 1972 Summer Olympics
Iranian male sport wrestlers
Olympic wrestlers of Iran
Olympic bronze medalists for Iran
Asian Games gold medalists for Iran
Olympic medalists in wrestling
Asian Games medalists in wrestling
Wrestlers at the 1970 Asian Games
World Wrestling Championships medalists
Medalists at the 1968 Summer Olympics

Medalists at the 1970 Asian Games
20th-century Iranian people
21st-century Iranian people
World Wrestling Champions